The Seventeenth Oklahoma Legislature was a meeting of the legislative branch of the government of Oklahoma, composed of the Oklahoma Senate and the Oklahoma House of Representatives. The state legislature met in regular session at the Oklahoma State Capitol in Oklahoma City from January 3 to April 29, 1939, during the term of Governor Leon C. Phillips. Phillips was the first state representative to become Governor of Oklahoma.

As Lieutenant Governor of Oklahoma, James E. Berry served as the President of the Senate. Jim A. Rinehart served as President pro tempore of the Oklahoma Senate, making him the chief leader and organizer of the chamber. Don Welch served as Speaker of the Oklahoma House of Representatives.

Dates of session
Regular session: January 3-April 29, 1939
Previous: 16th Legislature • Next: 18th Legislature

Party composition

Senate

House of Representatives

Leadership

Senate
As Lieutenant Governor of Oklahoma, James E. Berry served as the President of the Senate, giving him a tie-breaking vote and the authority to serve as the presiding officer. Jim A. Rinehart of El Reno, Oklahoma, was elected by state senators to serve as President pro tempore of the Oklahoma Senate, making him the chief leader and organizer of the chamber.

House of Representatives
The Oklahoma Democratic Party held 102 of the 115 seats in the Oklahoma House of Representatives in 1939, allowing them to select the Speaker of the Oklahoma House of Representatives. Don Welch of Madill, Oklahoma, served as Speaker during the regular session in 1939. Harold Freeman of Pauls Valley, Oklahoma, served as the second-in-command, or Speaker Pro Tempore.

Members

Senate

Table based on state almanac.

House of Representatives

Table based on government database.

References

External links
Oklahoma Legislature
Oklahoma House of Representatives
Oklahoma Senate

Oklahoma legislative sessions
1939 in Oklahoma
1940 in Oklahoma
1939 U.S. legislative sessions
1940 U.S. legislative sessions